Taps at Reveille (1935) is a collection of 18 short stories by F. Scott Fitzgerald.  It was the fourth and final collection of short stories Fitzgerald published in his lifetime.  All were timed to appear a few months to a year after each of his four completed novels were published.

Contents
The eighteen stories collected in Taps at Reveille are:

Stories about Basil Duke Lee:
 "The Scandal Detectives"
 "The Freshest Boy"
 "He Thinks He's Wonderful"
 "The Captured Shadow"
 "The Perfect Life"

Stories about Josephine Perry:
 "First Blood"
 "A Nice Quiet Place"
 "A Woman with a Past"

Others
 "Crazy Sunday"
 "Two Wrongs"
 "The Night of Chancellorsville"
 "The Last of the Belles"
 "Majesty"
 "Family in the Wind"
 "A Short Trip Home"
 "One Interne"
 "The Fiend"
 "Babylon Revisited"

Publication
Taps at Reveille was published on March 10, 1935.  The collection was dedicated to Fitzgerald's agent Harold Ober.

Reception
In The New York Times, critic Edith Walton gave Fitzgerald's final collection a mixed reception. "The characteristic seal of his brilliance stamps the entire book, but it is a brilliance which splutters off too frequently into mere razzle-dazzle." Citing the Basil Duke Lee stories as "small masterpieces," Walton called Babylon Revisited "probably the most mature and substantial story in the book. A rueful, though incompleted, farewell to the Jazz Age, its setting is Paris and its tone one of anguish for past follies." Walton continues, "It has become a dreadful commonplace to say that Mr. Fitzgerald's material is rarely worthy of his talents. Unfortunately, however, the platitude represents truth. Scott Fitzgerald's mastery of style — swift, sure, polished, firm — is so complete that even his most trivial efforts are dignified by his technical competence. All his writing has a glamorous gloss upon it; it is always entertaining; it is always beautifully executed."

References

External links 
The New York Times on Taps at Reveille
F. Scott Fitzgerald Centenary: Matthew J. Bruccoli Collection at the University of South Carolina

1935 short story collections
Short story collections by F. Scott Fitzgerald